Cyrenaica is a historic region of Libya.

Cyrenaica may also refer to:

 Crete and Cyrenaica
 Islamic Tripolitania and Cyrenaica
 Ottoman Cyrenaica
 Italian Cyrenaica
 Emirate of Cyrenaica
 Cyrenaica province

See also
Cyrene (disambiguation)